Randy Humphrey Racing was an auto racing team that competed in the NASCAR Sprint Cup Series. They fielded the No. 77 Ford Fusion for drivers Dave Blaney, Nelson Piquet Jr., Joe Nemechek, and Corey LaJoie.

History

Owner Randy Humphrey was originally partnered with Phil Parsons, operating MSRP Motorsports in the Nationwide Series and HP Racing/Prism Motorsports in the Sprint Cup Series. Humphrey left the team in 2012, and partnered with TriStar/PME Engines owner Mark Smith to field a 19 and 91 car as Humphrey-Smith Racing, mostly as start and parks. The TriStar Cup team shut down before the Chase for the Cup in 2013.

2014
In January 2014, it was announced that Humphrey was forming his own team with veteran driver Dave Blaney and veteran crew chief Peter Sospenzo. The team purchased Fords from Germain Racing, which was switching to Chevrolet. The team ran car number 77, which Blaney had run with Jasper Motorsports, and acquired the 2013 owner points from the Humphrey Smith No. 19, although it was ranked too deeply to grant them a provisional in the first three races of 2014. The team's first race was to be the 2014 Daytona 500, but was involved in a multi-car crash in practice, totaling their only car and forcing them to withdraw from the race. The team entered in all of the first 15 races of the season with Blaney, only making four, and had a best finish of 33rd at Dover, 17 laps down. On June 25, prior to the race at Kentucky Speedway, team owner Randy Humphrey announced that the team would be "retooling" their program, citing a lack of performance and "people issues." The hiatus was initially announced as four weeks, planning to return at Indianapolis in June, though they would skip an additional race at Pocono.

Upon the team's return to competition at Watkins Glen International in August, Nationwide and Camping World Trucks winner Nelson Piquet Jr. was placed in the car with sponsorship from WORKS Yard Tools.  Three weeks later, Joe Nemechek would qualify on speed at Atlanta.  At Loudon in September, Richard Petty Motorsports development driver Corey LaJoie made his Sprint Cup debut, starting and finishing 41st, 102 laps down. LaJoie would make another start at Charlotte, in the Bank of America 500. The team shut down at the end of the season.

Car No. 77 results

References

American auto racing teams
Companies based in North Carolina
NASCAR
Defunct NASCAR teams
Auto racing teams established in 2014
Auto racing teams disestablished in 2014